Gustave Zédé was a French naval engineer and pioneering designer of submarines.

Early life
He was born in Paris in February 1825.  After studying at the École Polytechnique in November 1843 he qualified in 1845 as a Marine engineer and went to work at the Brest Naval Dockyard.

Career
By 1863 he was chief engineer in charge of ship-building under the direction of Henri Dupuy de Lôme, and under his leadership Zédé helped design and build Gymnote, the first practicable submarine, which was launched in 1880,
In 1877 Zédé had become Director of Naval Construction, but in 1880 he left to be a director of the Société Nouvelle des Forges et Chantiers de la Méditerranée, a shipyard at Toulon.

In 1880 he started planning the construction of Sirene, a larger version of the Gymnote and France's (and one of the world's) earliest commissioned naval submarines. Sirene was ordered by the French Navy in 1890, and launched in 1893. After Zédé's death she was renamed in his honour.

Gustave Zédé died on 26 April 1891, from an explosion that occurred while he was testing the propulsion system for a new torpedo.

Recognition
In 1866 Zédé was made an Officier ("Officer") of the Legion of Honour
The French Navy has named for four ships after Zédé; two submarines and two surface ships
There are streets named for Zédé in Paris, Brest and Lanester, in Brittany

Notes

See also
Arthur Constantin Krebs

References
Gustave Zédé at fr WP (French) 
 Gustave Zédé at netmarine (French)

1825 births
1891 deaths
École Polytechnique alumni
French naval architects
Submarine pioneers